Season 2018–19 was Dumbarton's first in the third tier of Scottish football for six years, having finished ninth and lost the playoffs in 2017–18. Dumbarton also competed in the Challenge Cup, Scottish League Cup and the Scottish Cup.

Story of the season

May 

Two days after the Sons relegation to Scottish League One club director Callum Hosie died. The same day Tom Walsh became the first member of the squad to depart, joining Inverness Caledonian Thistle on a two-year deal. On 16 May the club released seven players, with David Smith, David Wilson, Kyle Prior, Grant Gallagher, Chris Johnston, Dougie Hill and Dimitris Froxylias all exiting. Meanwhile, Jamie Ewings was released as a player, but continued as the club's goalkeeper coach. Calum Gallagher, Scott Gallacher, Andy Dowie, Stuart Carswell, Kyle Hutton and Danny Handling were all offered new deals, whilst Christopher McLaughlin and Iain Russell were offered training facilities. Pre-season friendlies were then arranged against East Kilbride, Cumbernauld Colts and Queen's Park. Goalkeeper Scott Gallacher rejected a new deal to join Airdrieonians on 19 May, joining up with Grant Gallagher at the Lanarkshire side. Captain Andy Dowie was the first man to re-sign for the club, inking a one-year deal on 23 May, and he was followed by Kyle Hutton. Liam Dick left however, having made 17 appearances since signing in January 2018. Meanwhile, a fourth pre-season friendly was arranged against Heart of Midlothian on 7 July. Willie Dyer became the club's first signing of the summer on 30 May, joining on a year long deal from Brechin City.

June 
June started with striker Mark Stewart having the second year of his contract cancelled. Following this Turnberry Homes signed a new two-year deal to continue as the club's shirt sponsors. Bobby Barr became the club's second signing of the summer, joining on a year long deal from Raith Rovers. Ross Forbes was announced as the club's third summer signing on 11 June – signing a season long deal nine years after a loan spell with the club. A day later the club's top scorer from the 2017–18 season, Calum Gallagher, signed a new one-year deal. The week ended with Grant Adam becoming the club's fourth signing of the summer, joining on a one-year deal from Forfar Athletic. His arrival was followed by that of striker Rory Loy, who joined after leaving Falkirk, however Danny Handling turned down a new deal with the club to join Scottish League Two side Edinburgh City. Stuart Carswell was the next player to commit himself for another season, signing a new one-year deal after 54 appearances and two goals in his 18 months at the club. The following week defenders Ross Perry and Cammy Ballantyne signed for the club on year-long deals, and they were joined by Ryan Thomson who joined after leaving Stranraer. A day after signing Thomson marked his debut with a goal, which was added to by strikes from Calum Gallagher and Iain Russell (playing as a trialist) as Dumbarton overcame Lowland League side East Kilbride in their first friendly of the season.

July 
Russell made it two in as many games, as he scored a late winner in a 3–2 comeback victory against Cumbernauld Colts on 1 July, with fellow trialist Andy Little also on target. That form earned him a new year long deal, and he made his third debut as a signed player in a 2–0 friendly defeat to Heart of Midlothian. Little also joined the club, on a short-term deal, on 11 July. A busy week also saw the arrival of goalkeeper Jamie McGowan, who joined having left Greenock Morton, and forward Michael Paton who had impressed as a trialist against Heart of Midlothian. In the Scottish League Cup Sons opened their season with a 0–0 draw against Lowland League champions Spartans, winning the bonus point on penalties after Grant Adam saved two spot-kicks. They followed that result up with a 1–0 victory over Queen's Park thanks to a Calum Gallagher goal, their first victory since the restructuring of the Cup in the summer of 2016. Defeat to Scottish Premiership Kilmarnock courtesy of a Kris Boyd hat-trick followed, despite the Sons taking the lead twice. Rory Loy made his debut for the club as a second-half substitute after missing the earlier games through injury, with Craig Barr and Bobby Barr (his first goal for the club) scoring for Dumbarton. The League Cup campaign ended on a low note however, with a 6–0 defeat to St Mirren.

August 
Dumbarton kicked off their league campaign with a 2–0 victory against East Fife, with Andy Dowie scoring his first goal for the club. That was followed by a 2–0 home defeat to Forfar Athletic. The club did progress to the 2nd round of the Scottish Challenge Cup however, with Michael Paton scoring his first goal for the club in a 2–1 victory against Scottish Championship side Greenock Morton. That was followed by a 1–1 draw at home with Arbroath, with Ross Forbes scoring an injury-time leveler, before defeat against Brechin City, where the Sons threw away a two-goal lead with 30 minutes remaining. Bobby Barr and trialist Brad Spencer got the goals. With the squad down to bare bones Stevie Aitken dipped into the transfer market once more – signing Spencer on a permanent deal along with Dundee United defender Scott Allardice. On deadline day Jack Aitchison became the 14th signing of the summer – joining on a loan deal until January from Celtic.

September 
September opened with another defeat, this time against newly promoted Stenhousemuir. Craig McPherson was appointed first-team coach a week later, but a third consecutive loss followed, this time in the Scottish Challenge Cup against Montrose. The same opponents visited a week later in the league, and this time Dumbarton recorded victory. Two goals inside two minutes from Andy Dowie and Ross Forbes gave the Sons their first home league win since early April. Brad Spencer scored his first goal as a signed player for the club a week later, but it was cancelled out by a Cammy Russell strike as Sons drew their next game against Airdrieonians. The month ended with a 5–1 home defeat to Raith Rovers. On the final day of the transfer window Dom Thomas became the club's 15th signing of the summer – joining on a four-month loan from Kilmarnock.

October 
With Grant Adam injured, Sons turned to the transfer market again – bringing in Robbie Mutch on an emergency loan deal. Mutch made his debut the following day in a 3–2 defeat to Stranraer that saw Sons end the first quarter in ninth position – only ahead of Montrose on goal difference. Two days later Stephen Aitken was sacked having been in charge since May 2015. Ian Durrant and Jamie Ewings were put in temporary charge for the trip to Arbroath which Sons lost 3–1. On 21 October Jim Duffy was announced as the club's new manager with Craig McPherson returning to the club as his assistant a fortnight after leaving his position as first team coach. His first action was to sign goalkeeper Chris Smith on loan from East Kilbride after Falkirk recalled Robbie Mutch. Smith debuted that weekend, keeping a clean sheet in a 4–0 victory against East Fife in Duffy's first game in charge.

November 
Dumbarton failed to build on that result however, falling to the foot of the Scottish League One table after a 1–0 defeat to Montrose on 3 November. Three days later striker Andrew Little announced his retirement from football. A 2–1 home victory against Stenhousemuir followed, before Sons were able to name just two outfield subs in a 3–0 defeat to Forfar Athletic. The following week another 3–0 defeat followed, this time against Airdrieonians in the Scottish Cup.

December 
The inconsistent form continued into December, as Sons opened the month with a 4–1 victory against Brechin City, thanks to a brace from Calum Gallagher and goals from Ross Forbes and Dom Thomas. A week later an injury time Brad Spencer goal rescued a point at home to Airdrieonians, before Sons lost 4–2 to Raith Rovers – conceding twice in the final two minutes. Their final home game of 2018 ended in a 1–0 defeat to Stranraer, before an injury time Ross Forbes free-kick earned a point against Stenhousemuir in their final game of 2018. The year ended with kit coordinator Colm McKinlay, who had been with the club since Stephen Aitken's appointment in 2015, resigning from the position.

January 
2019 opened with Scott Allardice returning to parent club Dundee United. A day later Dumbarton suffered their second consecutive home defeat, losing 3–2 to Forfar Athletic with Bobby Barr scoring twice. Ben Armour became the club's first signing of the window, joining on a development loan from Greenock Morton, whilst Dom Thomas returned to Kilmarnock at the end of his loan spell. Armour made his debut the next day, starting in a 1–0 defeat to ninth placed Brechin City, where Sons conceded in injury time and played half-an-hour with ten men following the dismissal of Michael Paton. The following day club captain Andy Dowie left by mutual consent to focus on a career outside football. Dowie was followed by summer arrivals Brad Spencer and Jamie McGowan who were both released on 16 January. David Ferguson became the club's second signing of the window, joining on loan from Ayr United and his arrival was quickly followed by that of Henk van Schaik who joined on a temporary transfer from Livingston. Both players made their debut in a 1–1 draw with Montrose, with trialist striker Boris Melingui scoring for the Sons. Melingui signed a contract until the end of the season on 30 January and his arrival was followed by that of goalkeeper Conor Brennan who also joined following his release by Brechin City. On deadline day Dom Thomas returned to the club on loan from Kilmarnock.

February 
Thomas marked his return with a goal and an assist in a 2–2 draw with Airdrieonians. He scored again a fortnight later, with Ross Forbes and Ross Perry also on the scoresheet as Dumbarton recorded their first away victory since the opening day against Stranraer in Ross Forbes' first game as club captain. Meanwhile, Robert Brooks was appointed the club's new kit coordinator, replacing Colm McKinlay who had resigned in December. Sons made it two away wins in a row, with Thomas getting his first senior hat-trick in a 4–3 success against East Fife. The month ended with a 2–2 draw against Raith Rovers, with Ross Forbes and Stuart Carswell on the scoresheet.

March 
The positive form continued into March, as Sons opened the month with a 2–0 victory against league leaders Arbroath. Defender Brian McLean became Sons' 23rd signing of the season on 6 March, joining on a deal until the end of the season having left Brunei based DPMM FC. Dom Thomas and Jim Duffy were then announced as the League One Player of the Month for February. McLean made his debut the following weekend in a 1–3 victory against Montrose as Dumbarton went seven league games unbeaten for the first time since early 2014. After a game against Airdrieonians fell to the weather, Sons unbeaten run ended on 23 March with a 4–1 defeat to Raith Rovers. The following week Sons suffered another loss, this time against Stenhousemuir.

April 
April opened with Dumbarton drawing their re-arranged League One match with Airdrieonians 3-3 thanks to goals from Dom Thomas, Calum Gallagher and Ross Forbes. Sons then recorded their first victory in three games with a 2–1 triumph against Brechin City thanks to an own-goal from former Dumbarton player Dougie Hill and a Calum Gallagher header. A scoreless draw with Forfar Athletic followed, leaving Sons four points clear of the bottom two positions with three games remaining. Safety was secured a week later with a 3–0 victory against East Fife – Sons' fourth success of the season against the Fifers. The following week forward Dom Thomas was nominated for PFA Scotland League One Players' Player of the Year after scoring 14 times in 24 games for the club. April ended with a 2–1 victory against Stranraer, with Ross Forbes and Calum Gallagher both scoring their 13th goals of the season. After the match Stuart Carswell was named as the club's Player of the Year, with Dom Thomas picking up the Young Player of the Year award.

May 
May began with Calum Gallagher and Jim Duffy picking up the League One Player and Manager of the Month awards for April, Sons' second awards double of the season. The season ended with a 1–1 draw with Champions Arbroath, a result that left the Sons sixth in the table.

First team transfers 
From end of 2017–18 season, to last match of season 2018–19

In

Out

Fixtures and results

Friendlies

Scottish League One

Scottish Cup

Scottish League Cup

Table

Matches

Scottish Challenge Cup

League table

Player statistics

All competitions

Captains

Management statistics
Last Updated 19:37 April 27, 2019

References 

Dumbarton
Dumbarton